Forbes was launched at Calcutta in 1805. She was wrecked in the Billeton Straits in the southern part of the Karimata Strait on 11 September 1806.

Career
Forbes sailed under the command of Frazer Sinclair. She traded on the coast of India and between India and the Malay archipelago. In late 1806 Sinclair engaged in privateering. 

On 6 September 1806 Lord Forbes was westward of the east coast of Madura Island when she encountered the Dutch frigate Phoenix, which was sailing from Batavia to Sourabaya. Sinclair hoisted American colours and sailed within point blank range of Phoenix, which fired a few shots, but without effect.

On 7 September Forbes captured a Dutch brig sailing from Batavia to Sourabaya. The next day Forbes captured two more Dutch vessels. Sinclair put a prize crew of 16 men, under the command of his second mate, Mr. Hitchins, on one of these two vessels with orders to cruize in search of more prizes.

Loss
After Forbes struck a reef on 11 September 1806, the crew took to her boats to get her off the reef she was on. They were unsuccessful and she eventually slipped off the reef and sank. At dawn the 78 European officers and men, and lascars took to her boats. The pinnace held Sinclair, the 4th mate, and 11 crew. One longboat held the 1st and 3rd officers and 27 crew. The second longboat held 40 crew. There is some uncertainty about five Javanese who had been in the brig taken in prize. They may have refused to leave the wreck, or may have been divided among the boats.

On 19 September, the pinnace encountered General Baird, Harford, master, which supplied the men in the pinnace with supplies. The pinnace arrived at Malacca on 22 September. The longboat with the other Europeans arrived on 25 September. It is not clear what happened to the second longboat with the lascars.

On 22 October, a Dutch snow arrived at Penang. She was under the command of Mr. Hitchins, Forbess second mate. He had captured her and then transferred her crew and his other prisoners to the brig he had been sailing in, taking over the snow. She was larger and had a cargo worth 14–15,000 dollars.

Notes

Citations

References
 
 
 

1805 ships
British ships built in India
Age of Sail merchant ships of England
Privateer ships of the United Kingdom
Maritime incidents in 1806